Begonia tetrandra is a species of plant in the family Begoniaceae. It is endemic to Ecuador.  Its natural habitat is subtropical or tropical moist montane forests. It is threatened by habitat loss.

References

tetrandra
Endemic flora of Ecuador
Vulnerable plants
Taxonomy articles created by Polbot